Emanuel Thiel (1 May 1883 – 2 August 1944) was a Czechoslovak equestrian. He competed at the 1924 Summer Olympics and the 1928 Summer Olympics.

References

External links
 

1883 births
1944 deaths
Czechoslovak male equestrians
Olympic equestrians of Czechoslovakia
Equestrians at the 1924 Summer Olympics
Equestrians at the 1928 Summer Olympics
People from Rhede
Sportspeople from Münster (region)